Cao Bằng is a province of the Northeast region of Vietnam. The province has borders with Hà Giang, Tuyên Quang, Bắc Kạn, and Lạng Sơn provinces within Vietnam. It also has a common international border with Guangxi province in China. The province covers 6,724.6 square kilometres, and, as of 2019, its population was 530,341 people.

The area has a rich history tracing to the Bronze Age Tây Âu (西甌) Kingdom of the ethnic Tày. Cao Bằng has several points of historical interest as well as many natural features such as the Pác Bó (at the mouth of the confluence of two rivers, the Bằng Giang and Hien rivers) where Hồ Chí Minh in January 1941 established a revolutionary force at Cốc Bó cave, the Mạc emperor's Temple, the Kỳ Sầm Temple, Coi Bin Church, the Bản Giốc waterfall area at the international border between Vietnam and China, and the Thang Hen Mountain Lake.

History
Cao Bằng's history can be traced to the Bronze Age when the Tày Tây Âu Kingdom flourished. The Tây Âu or Âu Việt were a conglomeration of upland Tai tribes living in what is today the mountainous region of northernmost Vietnam, western Guangdong, and southern Guangxi, China, since at least the 3rd century BC. According to local lore, the capital was located near today Cao Bằng City. In the 3rd century BC, the Tây Âu leader Thục Phán shifted their capital to Cổ Loa in the Red River Delta.  

Cao Bằng's proximity to China has meant that it has had a somewhat turbulent history, having changed hands a number of times. What are now the provinces of Cao Bằng and Lạng Sơn were known as châu Quảng Nguyên during the time of the Lý and Trần Dynasties. Quảng Nguyên became part of Đại Việt in 1039, when Emperor Lý Thái Tông expelled Nùng Trí Cao, a Tày-Nùng leader, from the area.

At the end of the 14th century, Tày lords dynasties ruled the area, such as Bế Khắc Thiệu and Nga Dac Thai. In the 1430s, the Lê Dynasty had many rebellions. Royalty faced strong revolt during the 16th and early part of the 17th century – Mạc Đăng Dung initially occupied the territory and the Lê throne in 1527. However, the Lê kings were reinstated in 1592. Still, the war for control of the region continued and the Mạc family had the upper hand as they declared it an independent region and ruled for 75 years. As witness to this period, here lie ruins of a temple, which was also the palace of the Mạc Kings. Cao Bình was a prominent administrative town until the French occupied the territory; the capital was shifted to the Cao Bằng peninsula when the French conquered the area in 1884. They fortified the town with a fort on a hill overlooking the town (ruins of this fort are seen even now). This fort area is now a high-security zone of the People’s Army of Vietnam.

Cao Bằng has a long history of revolutionaries and nationalists. The significant history of the peninsula to the present regime is recorded from the 1920s when it became the "cradle of the revolutionary movement in the north". Many pro-independence groups based themselves in the mountains. The Communist Party of Vietnam chose the province as a base, using the rough terrain as protection.

In 1950, the province had 10 districts: Bảo Lạc, Hạ Lang, Hòa An, Nguyên Bình, Phú Thạch, Phục Hòa, Quảng Uyên, Thạch An, Trấn Biên and Trùng Khánh. In 1958, Trấn Biên was renamed Trà Lĩnh. The district of Thông Nông was created out of part of the district of Hà Quảng by Decision 67-CP on 7 April 1966. The districts of Phục Hòa and Quảng Uyên were merged to become Quảng Hòa by Decision 27-CP on 8 March 1967. The district of Hạ Lang was abolished and integrated into the districts of Quảng Hòa and Trùng Khánh by Decision 176-CP on 15 September 1969.

In December 1978, the two districts of Ngân Sơn and Chợ Rã were transferred from the province of Bắc Thái to Cao Bằng by a decree of the congress of the Communist Party. This meant that Cao Bằng had 11 districts: Bảo Lạc, Hà Quảng, Hòa An, Nguyên Bình, Quảng Hòa, Thạch An, Thông Nông, Trà Lĩnh, Trùng Khánh, Ngân Sơn and Chợ Rã. The district of Chợ Rã was renamed Ba Bể by Decision 144-HĐBT on 6 November 1984.

On 27 February 1979, during the Sino-Vietnamese War, Chinese troops entered and occupied the city of Cao Bằng, inflicting a "scorched earth" policy by levelling most of the city, including places of worship. The historical areas near the Pác Bó caves in the commune of Trường Hà in Hà Quảng district were mined and bombed, demolishing most of the cave mouth where Hồ Chí Minh based his guerrilla activities in the 1940s and 1950s. In 1996, the districts of Ngân Sơn and Ba Bể were transferred into the newly created province of Bắc Kạn. The district of Bảo Lâm was created by carving out a portion of Bảo Lạc District, in accordance with Decree 52/2000/NĐ-CP on 25 September 2000.

Geography

Cao Bằng province located in the northern part of the country has borders with Hà Giang, Tuyên Quang, Bắc Kạn, and Lạng Sơn provinces within Vietnam. It also has a common international border ( long) with the Guangxi province of the People's Republic of China. The main town is also named Cao Bằng.

The geographical setting of the province is mostly mountainous, with land available for habitation thus being limited. Winter temperatures in some areas occasionally experience freezing conditions and some amount of snowfall. The Bản Giốc Waterfall which is on the border with China is a well-known natural feature in the province. The western side of Cao Bằng borders Tuyên Quang and Hà Giang provinces. The southern side of Cao Bằng borders the provinces of Bắc Kạn and Lạng Sơn. It stretches  from east to west, from Quảng Lâm in Bảo Lâm district to Lý Quốc in Hạ Lang district. Mountainous forests take up more than 90% of the province.

The Peninsular valley of Cao Bằng province is formed between the Bằng Giang and Hien rivers. The two rivers confluence to the northwest of the town. In the war with China the town was damaged in 1979 and has been since rebuilt. The market in Cao Bằng town is believed to be the largest in Vietnam. The road from Nao Pac to Cao Bằng passes through the Cao Bắc Pass. Since the elevation of the town is  it has a salubrious temperate climate throughout the year.

Climate

Demographics

The province of Cao Bằng is home to many people belonging to Vietnam's ethnic minority groups. The most notable of these are the Tày, Nùng, Dao, and Hmong.

It is one of the least populated provinces in the northern midlands and mountain areas of Vietnam. The male population during this period was 265,620 while the female population was 264,721. The rural population was 406,934 against an urban population of 123,407 (about 30% of the rural population).

There are more than 40 ethnic groups in Hà Giang recognized by the Vietnamese government. Each ethnicity has their own language, traditions, and subculture. The largest ethnic groups are: 
Tày (40.84%), Nùng (29.81%), Mông (11.65%), Dao (10.36%), Vietnamese (5.12%). Others accounted for the remaining 2.22%.

Languages spoken in Cao Bằng province include the following.

Hmong-Mien languages
Hmong
Kim Mun
Tai languages
Tày Bảo Lạc - Bảo Lạc District
Tày Trùng Khánh - Trùng Khánh District
Nùng An - Quảng Uyên District
Nùng Giang - Hà Quảng District
Giáy - Bảo Lạc District
Kra languages
En (Nùng Vên) - Hà Quảng District
Tibeto-Burman languages
Black Lolo - Bảo Lạc District

Administrative divisions
Cao Bằng is subdivided into 10 district-level sub-divisions and 161 commune-level sub-divisions.

Economy

Cao Bằng is relatively poor compared to other Vietnamese provinces. Most of the province's economy is centered on agriculture and forestry, although other industries exist. Facilities such as schools and hospitals tend to be in poor condition, but are gradually improving. Transportation, once a major problem, has been improved considerably by new road construction.

As against the national figure of 7,592 of Agriculture, Forestry and Fishery cooperatives there are only 4 cooperatives in the province; all are agricultural cooperatives. There are only 57 farms compared to the national total of 120,699.

The output value of agriculture produce at constant 1994 prices in the province was 676.6 billion đồngs against the national value of 156,681.9 billion đồngs. In 1994 the province produced 151,800 tonnes of cereals compared to the national production of 229.1 million tonnes  The per capita production of cereals in the district was 448.6 kg as against the national figure of 501.8 kg in
2007. In 2007, the industrial output of the province was a meagre 571.8 billion đồngs against the national output of 1.47 million billion đồngs.

Attractions

As the province is in the region where the Vietnamese people lived thousands of years ago before their southwards expansion, Cao Bằng has several points of historical interest as well as many natural features.

Pác Bó

Pác Bó, located at the mouth of the confluence of two rivers, namely the Bằng Giang and Hien rivers. Its historicity is due to the fact that Hồ Chí Minh, on his return from China (where he had lived for 30 years) on 28 January 1941, established a revolutionary force at a cave near Pác Bó valley inhabited by the Nùng tribes. He organized the revolutionary movement by training the cadres, translated the History of the Communist Party in the USSR into the Vietnamese language and also edited a revolutionary newspaper called the 'Independent Vietnam' from Pác Bó. The Vietnam Independence League (Việt Nam Độc Lập Đồng Minh Hội), known by its short form as Việt Minh, was established here during the Eighth Congress of the Communist Party Central Committee held at Pác Bó from 10–19 March 1941. Between 1941 and 1945 until the Japanese left was a period of great turmoil in Vietnam. The Japanese set up King Bai as the head of state to counter the influence of the French government and the Việt Minh had established themselves their rule in six provinces in North Vietnam in the Red River delta. Following the surrender of Japan on 13 August 1945 in World War II, Hồ Chí Minh had expanded the ambit of his "August revolution" to Hanoi, Huế and Saigon, and the king abdicated. Hồ Chí Minh declared the independence of Vietnam and addressed the nation from Hanoi on 2 September 1945. The Pac Ba Vestiges Area Exhibition Centre has an array of display of artifacts of the revolution with a Hồ Chí Minh House of Remembrance. A stream and a hill near Pác Bó were named as "Lenin Stream" and "Karl Marx Mountain".

Kỳ Sầm Temple
Kỳ Sầm Temple was built as a memorial at Nùng village ( east of Highway 203) of Ngan in honour of Nùng Trí Cao, Nùng Lord of Quảng Uyên for organizing the ethnic minority revolt in the 11th century against the Vietnamese monarchy. The first effort at rebellion against the King Lý Thái Tông was started by Nùng Trí Cao's father, Nùng Tồn Phúc, and elder brother, Nùng Trí Thông. This failed and both were caught and executed. Two years later Cao mobilised a rebellion army and captured the territory and declared himself as the king of the Nùng Kingdom and named it as Dai Lich. However, this occupancy was short-lived as he was captured by Viet forces. He was, however, let go by the King and allowed to return to Quảng Uyên. Six years later he again launched a rebellion against the king in 1048 and captured the territory in southern China and declared himself as the "Emperor of Đại Nam." His kingdom survived for 5 years by the manipulation of the King of China and the King of Viet. However, in 1053 the Vietnamese king Lý Thái Tông captured Cao and executed him. The temple built in his honour, though ancient, is now a refurbished monument (renovated in the 19th century) consisting of two buildings. The outer building has the altar of one of his generals and the inner shrine housed the images of Cao, his wife and his mother till they were stolen a few years ago. An inscription still seen here narrates Cao's war exploits and his avowed commitment to the cause of his nation.

Coi Binh Church
Coi Binh Church is one of the three churches that were built in 1906 by the French; the other two are at Cao Bằng and That Khe. Except for the Vicar's house the rest of the residential buildings around the church were destroyed in 1979. The vicarage is now the venue of "Cao Bằng region's most famous apiaries".

Mạc King's Temple
Mạc King's Temple is the 16th-century palace of the Mạc Dynasty. It is located on a hill top above the Làng Đến (meaning the "Temple Village"). It is located on the west bank of the Dau Gen River, which is a tributary of the Bằng Giang River. The construction of this palace is credited to a general of the Lê Army in 1521–1522 after he forcibly dethroned the 11 year King Lê Chiêu Tông, exiled him and installed his brother Lê Thung as the king. However, two years later Lê Chiêu Tông was reinstalled as the King of Đại Việt. The Mạc Dynasty then ruled for 65 years. The Lê dynasty continued to fight the Mạc Kings and finally succeeded in regaining power in 1592 for a short time with the help of the powerful Trịnh family. A nephew of Mạc Mậu Hợp took control of Cao Bằng and three generations of his family ruled for 75 years till the armies of the Trịnh family captured Cao Bằng in 1667. The small palace building has cannons placed near the main entrance even now.

Nature

Cao Bằng, which lies on the Quây Sơn River, in Ngọc Khê commune, in Trùng Khánh district, has many mountains, forests, rivers and springs throughout. The area near Bản Doc Waterfall is a well-known scenic tourist site. The city of Cao Bằng has many buildings of World War II vintage of French design, which were in ruins, but have since been rebuilt. There is an 'Exhibition Centre' in the town where the history of the revolutionary struggle in Vietnam, which originated in this province, is displayed along with Hồ Chí Minh's vintage car, bearing the registration number "BAC 808".

Bản Giốc waterfall

At the top, the waterfall is seen in three parts divided by rocks and trees. As the water falls down the cliff and merges with sunlight, a seven-coloured rainbow formation is witnessed. Many green trees and flowers that perfume the air are located at the base of the fall.

The Bản Giốc waterfall area at the Vietnam-China border is stated to be "among areas having a borderline defined on rivers and streams". It has been clarified by the Head of the Border Committee that the borderline of the fall shall be as fixed along the median of the main flow which shall be done jointly by both sides. Even though in Vietnam the two falls are considered as one fall with the name Bản Giốc, the physical fact is that the waterfall is named under two ownership divisions namely, "Detian - Banyue Falls" (Chinese: 德天瀑布 & 板約瀑布) or "Bản Giốc Falls" (Vietnamese: thác Bản Giốc). The two falls have separate names in Chinese: Dé Tiān==;Bǎn Yuē==. However, in Vietnamese, the two falls are considered as two parts of one waterfall with the sole name Bản Giốc.

This water fall is the 4th largest waterfall along a national border in the world, the other three are Iguazu Falls, Victoria Falls, and Niagara Falls, in that order. It was also one of the crossing points for China's army during the brief Sino-Vietnamese War. Nearby there is the Tongling Gorge accessible only through a cavern from an adjoining gorge. Rediscovered only recently, it has many species of endemic plants found only in the gorge. This cave was a hideout for the local bandits whose treasure is occasionally still found in the cliff-side caves. Bản Giốc Fall is also famous for the fish species "tram huong." During the 1920s, this was a hunting and fishing location for the French who built cottages for this purpose.

Thang Hen Mountain lake
The lakes have been created in limestone formations and some of them flow out as steams. An unusual feature of the lakes is that their water level fluctuates like the tides of the seas, which phenomenon is attributed to the springs of water emerging from artesian wells in limestone formations. The lakes flow through the river, which eventually becomes the Bản Giốc waterfall.

Gallery

Notes

References

Cœdès, George. (1966). The Making of South East Asia (illustrated, reprint ed.). University of California Press. . Retrieved 7 August 2013.

External links
 (English version)

 
Northeast (Vietnam)
Provinces of Vietnam